The Great Duchess (German: Die tolle Herzogin) is a 1926 German silent film directed by Willi Wolff and starring Ellen Richter, Adolf Klein and Evi Eva.

The film's art direction was by Otto Erdmann and Hans Sohnle.

Cast
 Ellen Richter as Herzogin Gloria  
 Adolf Klein as Herzog von Burnham  
 Evi Eva as Lady Grace Neville  
 Alfred Gerasch as Graf Las Valdas  
 Walter Janssen as Lord Neville  
 Henry Bender as Spielsaalsdirektor  
 Heinrich Schroth as Steenberg  
 Jack Trevor as Abentuerer  
 Louis Brody

References

External links

1926 films
Films of the Weimar Republic
Films directed by Willi Wolff
German silent feature films
UFA GmbH films
Films based on Austrian novels
German black-and-white films